Manwa is a village in West Champaran district in the Indian state of Bihar.

Demographics
As of 2011 India census, Manwa had a population of 1616 in 268 households. Males constitute 54% of the population and females 45%. Manwa has an average literacy rate of 37.8%, lower than the national average of 74%: male literacy is 67.75%, and female literacy is 32.24%. In Manwa, 24.31% of the population is under 6 years of age.

References

Villages in West Champaran district